Operation Tiger was a World War II operation by the Netherlands East Indies Forces Intelligence Service on the island of Java. Almost all ended in disaster for the Allies.

 Tiger I party of three NEI landed November 1942 – it is thought all members were captured and shot
 Tiger II party of three NEI went on same sub as Tiger I landed at Serang Baai November 1942 – all members captured and executed
 Tiger III party of one landed February 1943 – never seen again
 Tiger IV party of one landed April 1943 – never seen again
 Tiger V party of one landed April 1943 – never seen again
 Tiger VI party of one landed July 1943 – member captured on 6 August

References

Military operations involving the Netherlands
Military operations of World War II involving Australia